Eric Ray Turner (September 20, 1968 – May 28, 2000) was an American professional football player who was a safety for the Cleveland Browns, Baltimore Ravens and Oakland Raiders in the National Football League (NFL). He died of stomach cancer  at the age of 31, two weeks after claiming he was not gravely ill. He was buried at Ivy Lawn Memorial Park in Ventura, California.

College career

Turner attended Ventura High School and then played college football for the UCLA Bruins, where he was an All-American in 1990. Nicknamed "E-Rock" by his teammates, Turner drew comparisons to former Bruins great Don Rogers. He was the 2nd overall pick in the 1991 NFL Draft—the highest choice for a defensive back in football's modern era (technically the highest since Jerry Stovall in 1963).

Professional career and death
Originally drafted by the Cleveland Browns, signed a four-year, $6 million contract, which included a $3.15 million signing bonus, making the first-year compensation a record for a National Football League rookie. In 1994, Turner had his finest NFL season. He recorded a league-leading 9 interceptions on his way to being named First-team All-Pro. One of those interceptions included a 93-yard return for a touchdown  against the Arizona Cardinals in a 32–0 victory. In week 15 against the powerful Dallas Cowboys, Turner tackled Jay Novacek at the one yard line on the game's final play to seal a 19–14 victory. Turner was an integral part of the Browns' number one ranked defense.

After the Browns moved to Baltimore in 1996, Turner played one season for the new Baltimore Ravens. He made his second Pro Bowl and was second on the team with 112 tackles and tied for lead with five interceptions, although those numbers went largely unnoticed on a defense that allowed 441 points, third-highest in the league. Following the 1996 season Turner, who had the most expensive contract among all NFL safeties, was cut by the Ravens and became an unrestricted free agent for the first time in his six-year career. Turner then signed a four-year, $6 million deal with the Raiders in 1997.

Turner recorded 30 interceptions in just 109 career games, including returns for touchdowns of 93 and 94 yards.

In the 2000 NFL off-season, after missing April mini-camp with the Raiders, rumors would start circulating that Turner was suffering from stomach cancer after it was reported that Turner had lost about 70 pounds from the 215-pounds he was at during the 1999 season. Two weeks before his death, Turner would release a statement through his agent attempting to dispute any rumors about his health stating “I realize people are concerned, but I have chosen to keep this issue within my family…” “…Contrary to published reports, I have not lost 70 pounds and am not gravely ill.”
 
On May 28, 2000, Turner would be rushed to Los Robles Hospital & Medical Center in Thousand Oaks, California via ambulance after reportedly having trouble breathing. He would be admitted into intensive care and died six hours after arrival at the age of 31. The cause of Turner’s death was listed as “complications of abdominal cancer.”

Upon his death, teammate Napoleon Kaufman said "He was compassionate and a class act. It was truly a pleasure to have known Eric and I will miss him." Another teammate, Greg Biekert, said "He always brought his competitive nature to the team, especially on defense. He was truly someone who you wanted around, I mean in life, too." In 2001, he was named to the Ventura County Sports Hall of Fame.  The football field at Ventura High School is named in his honor.

References

1968 births
2000 deaths
Players of American football from California
People from Ventura, California
African-American players of American football
American Conference Pro Bowl players
American football safeties
Deaths from stomach cancer
Cleveland Browns players
Baltimore Ravens players
Oakland Raiders players
UCLA Bruins football players
Deaths from cancer in California
All-American college football players
Burials in California
Burials at Ivy Lawn Cemetery
Sportspeople from Ventura County, California
20th-century African-American sportspeople